In mathematics, Matsushima's formula, introduced by , is a formula for the Betti numbers of a quotient of a symmetric space G/H by a discrete group, in terms of unitary representations of the group G.

References

Differential geometry
Algebraic topology
Topological graph theory
Generating functions